Strada statale 37 del Maloja (SS 37) is a motorway located in the Italian region of Lombardy.

The state road was established in 1928 with the name "del Maloia" and with the following route: "Chiavenna - Swiss border near Castasegna".

References 

37
Transport in Lombardy